Tigrioides luzonensis is a moth in the family Erebidae. It was described by Schaus in 1922. It is found in the Philippines.

References

Natural History Museum Lepidoptera generic names catalog

Moths described in 1922
Lithosiina